SH3 domain-binding glutamic acid-rich protein is a protein that in humans is encoded by the SH3BGR gene.

References

Further reading